Elaine Teo Shueh Fhern (born 5 February 1981) is a Malaysian Taekwondo exponent.
She is a holder of a 4th dan Taekwondo Black Belt from Korea and 5th dan Malaysia. She has represented Malaysia from 1999-2011 in various international tournaments.
Her experience as a professional Taekwondo exponent has placed her on the pedestal of honour nationally and internationally.
One of her most memorable experience was being the first Taekwondo exponent in Malaysia to qualify twice for the Olympic Games (2004 & 2008).

She made her official debut for the 2004 Summer Olympics in Athens, where she competed in the women's flyweight category (49 kg). She lost the first preliminary match to Guatemala's Euda Carías by a superiority decision from the judges, with a score of 4–4.

At the 2008 Summer Olympics in Beijing, Teo qualified this time for the featherweight category (57 kg),  because of an error in her entry form for the Asian Qualifiers. She lost the first preliminary match to Turkey's Azize Tanrıkulu, with a score of 4–7. Because Tanrıkulu advanced further into the final match against Lim Su-Jeong of South Korea, Teo offered another shot for a bronze medal triumph through the repechage bout, where she was eventually defeated by a tall American Taekwondo exponent Diana López, who was able to score only three points at the end of the match.

Teo also made her bid to qualify for the 2012 Summer Olympics in London; however, she was forced into a premature retirement after suffering a torn anterior cruciate ligament in her knee at the Asian Olympic Taekwondo Qualifier in Bangkok, Thailand at year 2011. For her contribution towards the development of Taekwondo internationally, Taekwondo Malaysia (TM/WTF) awarded Teo a "Commendation on Outstanding Contribution to Taekwondo.

Apart from her sports achievements, she is also the only Taekwondo athlete to have won the "2004 National Sportswoman of the year" by the Malaysian Ministry of Youth & Sports.

Furthermore, she was three time SEA Games Gold medalist in 1999, 2001 and 2007. She was the first athlete who won medal at Universiade Games in 2003. After that, once again she won a bronze medalists at 2005 World Universiade Games, Korea. Universiade.

She has a bachelor's degree holder of business administration. at Universiti Putra Malaysia in Selangor.

References

External links 

NBC Olympics Profile

1981 births
Living people
People from Malacca
Malaysian female taekwondo practitioners
Olympic taekwondo practitioners of Malaysia
Taekwondo practitioners at the 2004 Summer Olympics
Taekwondo practitioners at the 2008 Summer Olympics
Taekwondo practitioners at the 2002 Asian Games
Taekwondo practitioners at the 2010 Asian Games
Universiade medalists in taekwondo
Southeast Asian Games gold medalists for Malaysia
Southeast Asian Games bronze medalists for Malaysia
Southeast Asian Games medalists in taekwondo
Competitors at the 1999 Southeast Asian Games
Competitors at the 2001 Southeast Asian Games
Competitors at the 2007 Southeast Asian Games
Competitors at the 2009 Southeast Asian Games
Universiade bronze medalists for Malaysia
Asian Games competitors for Malaysia
Medalists at the 2003 Summer Universiade
Medalists at the 2005 Summer Universiade